Susuacanga is a genus of beetles in the family Cerambycidae, containing the following species:

 Susuacanga maculicornis (Bates, 1870)
 Susuacanga octoguttata (Germar, 1821)
 Susuacanga unicolor (Bates, 1870)

References

Eburiini